Ohtaki Dam is a concrete gravity dam located in Nara prefecture in Japan. The dam is used for flood control, water supply, irrigation and power production. The catchment area of the dam is 258 km2. The dam impounds about 251 ha of land when full and can store 84000 thousand cubic meters of water. The construction of the dam was started in 1962 and completed in 2012.

References

Dams in Nara Prefecture
2012 establishments in Japan